The 1939 Wyoming Cowboys football team represented the University of Wyoming in the Mountain States Conference (MSC) during the 1939 college football season.  In its first and only season under head coach Joel Hunt, the team compiled a 0–7–1 record (0–5–1 against MSC opponents) and was outscored by a total of 241 to 47.

Schedule

References

Wyoming
Wyoming Cowboys football seasons
Wyoming Cowboys football
College football winless seasons